Events from the year 1693 in England.

Incumbents
 Monarchs – William III and Mary II
 Parliament – 2nd of William and Mary

Events
 8 February – the College of William and Mary in Williamsburg, Virginia, is granted a Royal charter from King William III and Queen Mary II of England.
 March – William Congreve's first play, the comedy The Old Bachelor, is performed at the Theatre Royal, Drury Lane.
 17 June (27 June New Style) – Nine Years' War: The French fleet defeats the joint Dutch and English fleet at the Battle of Lagos off Portugal.
 19 July (29 July New Style) – Nine Years' War: The Dutch-English army led personally by King William III of England is defeated by the French (with Irish Jacobite mercenaries) at the Battle of Landen near Neerwinden in Flemish Brabant.
 October – Congreve's comedy The Double Dealer is first performed at Drury Lane.

Undated
 Bromsgrove School endowed by Sir Thomas Cookes.
 The Anglo-Saxon Alfred Jewel is discovered at North Petherton in Somerset.
 Financier Richard Hoare relocates Hoare's Bank (founded 1672) from Cheapside to Fleet Street in London.

Publications
 27 February – 17 March – John Dunton publishes The Ladies' Mercury, the first periodical specifically for women.
 John Locke's Some Thoughts Concerning Education.
 William Penn's proposal for European federation Essay on the Present and Future Peace of Europe.
 Vertue Rewarded – anonymous Irish novel, printed in London

Births
 4 February – George Lillo, playwright (died 1739)
 24 February – James Quin, actor (died 1766)
 24 March – John Harrison, clockmaker (died 1776)
 3 April – George Edwards, naturalist (died 1773)
 21 July – Thomas Pelham-Holles, 1st Duke of Newcastle-upon-Tyne, Prime Minister of Great Britain (died 1768)
 21 September – Thomas Secker, Archbishop of Canterbury (died 1768)

Deaths
 2 June – John Wildman, soldier and politician (born c. 1621)
 12 July – John Ashby, admiral (born c. 1640)
 24 November – William Sancroft, Archbishop of Canterbury (born 1617)

References

 
Years of the 17th century in England